K-25 is a  south–north state highway in the U.S. State of Kansas. K-25 runs from Oklahoma State Highway 136 (SH-136) at the Oklahoma State Line to Nebraska Highway 25 (N-25) at the Nebraska border, running through Leoti, Colby, and Atwood plus many more towns along the way.

K-25 was first designated as a state highway in 1927 and at that time began at K-45 west of Moscow, and ran north to the Nebraska border and continued as N-25. In 1959, the highway was extended south from, US-56 and K-51 to the Oklahoma border.

Route description
K-25 enters Kansas from Oklahoma, acting as a continuation of SH-136. K-25 turns northeast and begins to overlap K-51 and US-56. The highways continue parallel to Cimarron Valley Railroad tracks for roughly  then curves east. The roadway passes north of an airport about  later then enters the city of Hugoton as 11th Street. K-25, K-51 and US-56 continue approximately  then passes the Hugoton Middle and High Schools. The highway then soon reaches Main Street, where K-25 and US-56 turn north, as K-51 continues east. K-25 and US-56 proceed north along Main Street for  before curving northeast and exiting the city. The roadway continues about  then K-25 turns north and crosses the Cimarron Valley Railroad tracks, as US-56 continues northeast. K-25 continues north through relatively flat farmland for roughly  then intersects Road U. The highway advances another   and intersects Road Y. The roadway then enters into Grant County about  later.

As the highway enters the county it curves slightly northeast. K-25 continues for roughly  then curves northwest and crosses the Cimarron River. The roadway then crosses over the Old Santa Fe Trail before curving back north. The highway continues through flat farmland for  where it crosses the North Fork Cimarron River. About  later K-25 enters Ulysses as Colorado Street. The highway proceeds through the city for about  then crosses a Cimarron Valley Railroad track. The roadway then intersects US-160, also known as Oklahoma Street. K-25 continues north for about  before exiting the city. The highway then passes by the Ulysses Airport for roughly  then intersects County Road 9. The highway advances north through flat farmland for about  then enters into Kearny County.

The highway then reaches Lakin, where K-25 junctions US-50 and US-400 at the same time, and Leoti, where K-96 is intersected. 
 After leaving Leoti, K-25 continues due north for about 20 miles, until the route turns east for about 8 miles, until turning back north, immediately passing through Russell Springs. North of Russell Springs, US-40 is intersected, sharing an overlap for about ten miles. After turning onto US-40, the road starts to become hillier. K-25 separates just west of Baker. From there, it goes north to Colby, traveling through lightly rolling hills. Just south of Colby, I-70 is junctioned, with a good number of services near the interchange. K-25 then becomes a 4 lane divided highway until it enters Colby, where it changes back into a surface street. Within the Colby city limits, US-24 is intersected. K-25 continues out of Colby, alternating between flat and rolling land. In Atwood, US-36 is intersected. K-25 leaves Atwood traveling through rolling hills at first, but flattens out as it continues north. K-25 exits Kansas into Nebraska where N-25 continues toward Trenton, Nebraska.

The Kansas Department of Transportation (KDOT) tracks the traffic levels on its highways, and in 2018, they determined that on average the traffic varied from 230 vehicles south of Russell Springs, 2400 vehicles south of Lakin, to between 2500 and 5000 vehicles in Ulysses. K-25 is not included in the National Highway System, a system of highways important to the nation's defense, economy, and mobility. K-25 does connect to the National Highway System at its junction with US-50 and US-400 in Lakin, and at I-70 in Colby.

History

Establishment and extensions

In 1926, two sections of K-25 were established as K-23. One section went from Hugoton north to Leoti and the other section began in Russell Springs and ran north to the Nebraska border. By 1927, it was renumbered as K-25. At that time it began at K-45 west of Moscow, and ran north to K-46 in New Ulysses. It then continued to Leoti, where it intersected K-96. From here it continued northward through Russell Springs to US-40S east of Winona. The two routes then overlapped to Oakley, where it left US-40S and joined K-22 northward. The two routes continued northward to US-40N, where K-25 left the overlap and joined US-40N westbound. The two routes then continued west to Colby, where K-25 left the overlap and headed north. It soon crossed K-2 the crossed into Nebraska and continued as N-25. In a July 22, 1959 resolution, the section of highway had been brought up to state highway standards from the Oklahoma border to US-56 and K-51, and it became a southward extension of K-25.

Realignments
In a June 6, 1936 resolution, K-25 was slightly to eliminate two sharp curves, north of Lakin along the Kearny–Wichita county line. Between February 1937 and January 1938, US-270 was extended into Kansas, and overlapped K-25 from the Hugoton to Ulysses. Then in a May 18, 1981 resolution, the US-270 designation was removed. In a September 12, 1938 resolution, a  section of K-25 was realigned southwest of Lakin to eliminate four sharp curves. In a November 12, 1947 resolution, K-25 was realigned in and east of Leoti. In a March 30, 1950 resolution, K-25 and US-270 was realigned slightly east where it crosses the South Fork Cimarron River, just north of the Grant–Stevens county line. In a February 13, 1952 resolution, it was slightly realigned, southwest of Russell Springs. Also a new bridge was built across the Smoky Hill River. In two separate August 11, 1954 resolutions, Logan and Thomas counties had finished bringing the section of roadway, from west of Monument north to Colby, up to state highway standards. The section then became a realignment of K-25. In a March 9, 1955 resolution, the highway was realigned south of Atwood to eliminate four sharp curves.

Major intersections

See also

References

External links

025
Transportation in Stevens County, Kansas
Transportation in Grant County, Kansas
Transportation in Kearny County, Kansas
Transportation in Wichita County, Kansas
Transportation in Logan County, Kansas
Transportation in Thomas County, Kansas
Transportation in Rawlins County, Kansas